Millfore is a hill in the Minnigaff Hills, a sub-range of the Galloway Hills range, part of the Southern Uplands of Scotland. It lies northeast of Newton Stewart in Galloway Forest Park, Dumfries and Galloway. One of the less-visited of the Galloway Hills, it nonetheless provides excellent views from its summit over its neighbours and Loch Dee. Isolated from its westerly neighbours by the White Laggan glen, it is frequently climbed on its own from Clatteringshaws Loch to the east.

References

Marilyns of Scotland
Grahams
Donald mountains
Mountains and hills of Dumfries and Galloway
Mountains and hills of the Southern Uplands